The Sirio class (also known as the Saffo class) was a class of six sea-going steam-powered torpedo boats of the Italian Regia Marina (Royal Navy) built by the German shipyard Schichau-Werke from 1904–1906. They served in the Italo-Turkish War and the First World War.

Design
In 1904, work began at the German shipyard of Schichau-Werke,  Elbing (now Elbląg, Poland) on a class of six torpedo-boats for the Italian Navy.

Three  torpedo tubes were fitted, with a gun armament of three 47 mm guns. The ships had a crew of 38 officers and men.

Service
On delivery, the ships of the class equipped the 1st Squadron of High Seas Torpedo Boats, based first at La Spezia and then at Messina. The ships of the class were active during the Italo-Turkish War of 1911–1912, with Spica leading four Pegaso-class torpedo boats on a reconnaissance of the Dardanelles on the night of 18/19 July 1912, penetrating under fire about  before being stopped by a boom across the straits, and then escaping with little damage and no casualties. Two ships, Scorpione and Serpente, were lost following collisions during the First World War, with the remaining ships being rearmed, with two 76 mm anti-aircraft guns replacing the 47 mm guns. A third ship, Saffo was lost after running aground off Turkey on 2 April 1920. The surviving ships were disposed of in 1923.

Ships

Notes

Citations

References

External links
 Classe Sirio (1905) Marina Militare website

Torpedo boats of the Regia Marina
World War I naval ships of Italy